Bunkley is a surname. Notable people with the surname include:

Brit Bunkley (born 1955), New Zealand/U.S. artist
Brodrick Bunkley (born 1983), American football player

William Henry (Bill) Bunkley (born 1955), Salem Radio Talk Show Host Tampa, Florida

See also
Buckley (surname)
Bunkley v. Florida, a 2002 legal case in the United States Supreme Court